Ian Bailey (born 20 October 1956) is an English former professional footballer who played as a defender. He played for several clubs in the Football League. He later worked as physiotherapist to Rotherham United.

References

1956 births
Living people
English footballers
Association football defenders
Middlesbrough F.C. players
Doncaster Rovers F.C. players
Carlisle United F.C. players
Bolton Wanderers F.C. players
Sheffield Wednesday F.C. players
Blackpool F.C. players
English Football League players
Sheffield United F.C. non-playing staff
Rotherham United F.C. non-playing staff
Association football physiotherapists